Đoan Hùng is a rural district of Phú Thọ province in the Northeast region of Vietnam. As of 2003 the district had a population of 105,242. The district covers an area of 302 km². The district capital lies at Đoan Hùng.

Divisions
The district consists of the district capital, Đoan Hùng, and 27 communes: Đông Khê, Nghinh Xuyên, Hùng Quan, Vân Du, Chí Đám, Hữu Đô, Đại Nghĩa, Phú Thứ, Hùng Long, Vụ Quang, Minh Phú, Chân Mộng, Vân Đồn, Minh Tiến, Tiêu Sơn, Yên Kiện, Sóc Đăng, Ngọc Quan, Phong Phú, Phương Trung, Tây Cốc, Ca Đình, Phúc Lai, Quế Lâm, Bằng Luân, Bằng Doãn and Minh Lương.

References

Districts of Phú Thọ province